"Metal" is a song by Gary Numan from his 1979 album The Pleasure Principle. Lyrically, the song is heavily inspired by science fiction such as the works of Philip K. Dick and William S. Burroughs, and tells the story of an android who wishes to be human but never can be. The song was the B-side of "Cars" in the U.S. The song was released with an accompanying music video. The song recycles lyrics from two outtakes of the songs "The Crazies" and "We Have a Technical" from the recording sessions for Numan's album Replicas, which had been released earlier in 1979.

"Metal" has been a regular feature of Numan's live shows since his first tour in 1979, and appears on the majority of his live albums. In 1981, he wrote new lyrics to the tune of "Metal" for his album Dance and renamed the song "Moral". He often performs this re-recorded version. The song was again reworked into his aggressive new style in 1998, a version which is also still performed today.

The song has been covered by artists such as Nine Inch Nails, Thought Industry, Afrika Bambaataa (featuring Numan himself), Nouvelle Vague, and Poppy. Poppy's version is on the soundtrack of the 2019 video game WWE 2K20.

References

External links
 Metal (work) on MusicBrainz.org

Gary Numan songs
1979 songs
Poppy (entertainer) songs
Songs about robots
Songs about scientists
Songs written by Gary Numan